Breastfeeding Support for Indian Mothers or BSIM is a Facebook group that is popular for providing peer support for breastfeeding in India. With over 100,000 members as of 2019, the online community is run by a team of over 45 volunteers, mothers, and certified lactation consultants. The group has been widely recognized for its efforts in breastfeeding promotion, dispelling popular myths in Indian society around lactation and encouraging public nursing which is generally considered taboo in urban India.

Core beliefs 

The community is built around a set of foundational beliefs that is propagated through the group:

 Following WHO recommendations which say that babies have to be exclusively breast fed for the first six months, and extended breast feeding up to two years.
 Avoiding solids and water in the first six months. 
 The more the baby suckles, better is the breast milk secretion.
 Breastfeeding is the natural way to feed and nourish the baby

Achievements 

 In March 2019, The group founder Adhunika Prakash was recognized as a 'Web Wonder Women' by the Ministry for Women and Child Development for leading the group's initiatives in using technology to raise awareness about the importance of breastfeeding and the various policies that need to change in the country to enable and protect breastfeeding. 
 In 2019, the founder was selected as one of the top five Community Leaders in residence by Facebook and the group was selected to receive $100,000 to fund community building initiatives.

References

External links 
 Breastfeeding Support for Indian Mothers Facebook Group

Facebook groups
Breastfeeding advocacy